Idah Waringa is a multimedia journalist, presenter and documentary maker born in Nairobi, Kenya.

Biography 
Waringa was educated at Kianda School in Nairobi, Kenya and the United States International University Africa.

Career 
She has worked for Radio Africa Group Limited and the Nation Media Group (NMG).

Waringa is also a regular writer and contributor for the International Sports Press Association (AIPS) and the Planet Sport Football Africa show under Passion For Sport Productions. She has appeared several times on the Premier League Productions show Headline Makers and writes for Al Jazeera English.

In 2019, Waringa was one of seven African reporters selected by AIPS to cover the All Africa Games (African Games) in Morocco.

Waringa’s 2020 investigative documentary “The Football Con” exposed the rot of match-fixing in Kenya. Subsequently, the expose was recognized by the Global Investigative Journalists Network Africa chapter.

Waringa has hosted headline events on the East African sports calendar:

 2020 Tokyo Olympics launch on DSTV
 The Manchester United legend Dwight Yorke tour; 
 Magical Kenya Open Golf (presented by ABSA & now part of the European Tour);
 CIA Sports Disputes & Arbitration Lecture (Guest of Honour: Court of Arbitration for Sport Secretary General, Matthieu Reeb); 
 Safaricom Sports Personality of The Year Awards (SOYA); 
 and the Athletics Kenya Golden Gala Awards.

Awards and Honours 

A documentary by Waringa titled “The Football Con” received global recognition at the 2020 International Sports Press Association (AIPS) Awards held in Vigevano, Italy in the special category award for investigative reporting, alongside colleague Jeff Kinyanjui.

Waringa was also cited  as one of the Top 100 Kenyans in 2020.

Waringa won the 2019 Excellence Award For Young African Journalists in Sports, issued by the Government of Egypt & African Youth Bureau.

Interviews 
Idah has interviewed prominent sporting figures such as FIFA Ballon d'Or winner Ronaldinho, Manchester United treble-winning sportsman Dwight Yorke and Everton player Theo Walcott. Waringa has also interviewed the American double Olympic gold medalist, USADA Chairman and World Laureus President, Edwin Moses.

References 

Kenyan journalists
Year of birth missing (living people)
Living people
United States International University alumni